20th parallel may refer to:

20th parallel north, a circle of latitude in the Northern Hemisphere
20th parallel south, a circle of latitude in the Southern Hemisphere